Dark Lady may refer to:

Fictional entities

 Tragic mulatto, a stock fictional character often called a "dark lady"
Sylvanas Windrunner, a World of Warcraft character
 The Dark Lady, a playable hero in the computer game Heroes of Newerth
 A female Dark Lord

Literature

 Dark Lady (Shakespeare), the claimed addressee in a sonnet sequence by William Shakespeare
 Dark Lady (novel), a 1999 novel by Richard North Patterson
 Rosalind Franklin: The Dark Lady of DNA
 The Dark Lady: A Romance of the Far Future, a 1987 novel by Mike Resnick

Music

 Dark Lady (album), an album by Cher
 "Dark Lady" (song), the title track
 "Dark Lady", a song by The Scorpions from In Trance

Other uses

 Jiutian Xuannü, the Dark Lady of the Nine Heavens  (or simply Xuannü, the Dark Lady) in Chinese mythology

See also
 Dark Lord (disambiguation)